Tillandsia cauliflora is a species of flowering plant in the genus Tillandsia. This species is native to Costa Rica.

References

cauliflora
Flora of Costa Rica